Franz Anton, Count of Hohenzollern-Haigerloch (2 December 1657 at Sigmaringen Castle – 14 October 1702 in Friedlingen), was a reigning Count of Hohenzollern-Haigerloch.

Life 
Franz Anton was the youngest son of Prince Meinrad I of Hohenzollern-Sigmaringen (1605-1681) from his marriage to Anna Marie (1613-1682), the daughter of Baron Ferdinand of Törring at Seefeld.

He served in the imperial army and reached the rank of Field Marshal-Lieutenant.  Under the terms of the family's elevation to the rank of Prince, his eldest brother inherited the principality of Hohenzollern-Sigmaringen and Franz Anton only inherited the County of Hohenzollern-Haigerloch.  In 1692, Emperor Leopold I again confirmed that the Princes of Swabina branch of the House of Hohenzollern held the rank of Imperial Princes, he explicitly made an exception for the Haigerloch line.

Franz Anton fell in the Battle of Friedlingen, during the War of the Spanish Succession.

Marriage and issue 
Franz Anton married on 5 February 1687 to Anna Maria Eusebia (1670-1716), the daughter of Count Anton Eusebius of Königsegg-Aulendorf.  The couple had the following children:
 Ferdinand Leopold Anton (1692-1750), clergy and prime minister of Cologne
 Anna Maria (1694-1732), married in 1714 to Ludwig Xaver Fugger, Count of Kirchberg and Weissenhorn (1688-1746), a descendent of the Fugger Family.
 Maria Franziska (1697-1767), married in 1720 to Count Franz Hugo of Koenigsegg-Rothfels (1698-1772)
 Franz Christoph Anton (1699-1767), clergy and prime minister of Cologne

See also 
 House of Hohenzollern

Footnotes

References 
 Gustav Schilling: Geschichte des Hauses Hohenzollern in genealogisch fortlaufenden Biographien aller seiner Regenten von den ältesten bis auf die neuesten Zeiten, nach Urkunden und andern authentischen Quellen, Fleischer, Leipzig, 1843, p. 228 ff and 274,p. 228ff online, p. 274 online.

Counts of Hohenzollern-Haigerloch
House of Hohenzollern
1657 births
1702 deaths
17th-century German people